Levinthal's paradox is a thought experiment, also constituting a self-reference in the theory of protein folding. In 1969, Cyrus Levinthal noted that, because of the very large number of degrees of freedom in an unfolded polypeptide chain, the molecule has an astronomical number of possible conformations. An estimate of 10300 was made in one of his papers (often incorrectly cited as the 1968 paper). For example, a polypeptide of 100 residues will have 99 peptide bonds, and therefore 198 different phi and psi bond angles. If each of these bond angles can be in one of three stable conformations, the protein may misfold into a maximum of 3198 different conformations (including any possible folding redundancy). Therefore, if a protein were to attain its correctly folded configuration by sequentially sampling all the possible conformations, it would require a time longer than the age of the universe to arrive at its correct native conformation. This is true even if conformations are sampled at rapid (nanosecond or picosecond) rates. The "paradox" is that most small proteins fold spontaneously on a millisecond or even microsecond time scale. The solution to this paradox has been established by computational approaches to protein structure prediction.

Levinthal himself was aware that proteins fold spontaneously and on short timescales. He suggested that the paradox can be resolved if "protein folding is sped up and guided by the rapid formation of local interactions which then determine the further folding of the peptide; this suggests local amino acid sequences which form stable interactions and serve as nucleation points in the folding process". Indeed, the protein folding intermediates and the partially folded transition states were experimentally detected, which explains the fast protein folding. This is also described as protein folding directed within funnel-like energy landscapes. Some computational approaches to protein structure prediction have sought to identify and simulate the mechanism of protein folding.

Levinthal also suggested that the native structure might have a higher energy, if the lowest energy was not kinetically accessible. An analogy is a rock tumbling down a hillside that lodges in a gully rather than reaching the base.

Suggested explanations
 According to Edward Trifonov and Igor Berezovsky, the proteins fold by subunits (modules) of the size of 25–30 amino acids.

See also
 Chaperone proteins that assist other proteins in folding or unfolding
 Folding funnel
 Anfinsen's dogma

References

External links
 http://www-wales.ch.cam.ac.uk/~mark/levinthal/levinthal.html
 https://www.wired.com/wired/archive/9.07/blue_pr.html
 https://web.archive.org/web/20041011182039/http://www.sdsc.edu/~nair/levinthal.html

Protein structure
Physical paradoxes
Thought experiments